Nicole London (born February 3, 1976) is a former tennis player from the United States. She was a three-time Grand-Slam Girls' Doubles Champion. Her career on the tennis circuit was from 1990 to 1994.

Career 

London led the girls' team at Palos Verdes Peninsula High School.

At age 14 in 1991, London and her partner, Chanda Rubin, won the Women's Doubles title at the $10,000 ITF tournament in Mission Hills, California.

In 1992, with her partner Lindsay Davenport, she won the Australian Open Junior Girls' Doubles title and the 1992 US Open Junior Girls' Doubles title.

In September 1993, London and her partner Julie Steven won the US Open Junior Girls' Doubles title.

ITF Circuit finals

Doubles finals

References

Sources

External links 
 
 

American female tennis players
1976 births
Living people
Place of birth missing (living people)
Grand Slam (tennis) champions in girls' doubles
Australian Open (tennis) junior champions
US Open (tennis) junior champions
21st-century American women